A composite print is a print of a motion picture in which both sound and picture have been printed alongside each other on the film. Before a motion picture is actually released, it consists of several components, one containing the visual image, one containing the sound as recorded on-set, another containing the musical score, another containing sound effects, etc. All of these are eventually blended and printed together into a composite print. 

During the 1950s and 1960s, some movie spectacles, especially those in Cinerama, would have the sound and picture perfectly synchronized, but running on separate machines. This was necessary in three-strip Cinerama because the image consisted of three films  each forming a part of a gigantic picture, projected on a huge, deeply curved screen. The seven-track sound was recorded on magnetic tape, which ran simultaneously with the three projectors.

In the case of some films, such as the world premiere engagement of Carousel, which was made in CinemaScope 55, a six-track soundtrack could not be accommodated on the film, so the sound was played on an interlocking tape machine. The general release of the film did use the standard four-track stereo soundtrack, printed alongside the visual image on the film.

Film